CityJet or Cityjet may refer to:

 CityJet, an Irish airline
 CityJet (New Zealand), defunct New Zealand airline
 Cityjet, local train services of ÖBB (Austrian railways)